Microsoft Ignite is an annual conference for developers and IT professionals hosted by Microsoft. It has taken place in several locations around the world. The first conference, then known as TechEd, happened in 1993 in Orlando, Florida, United States. The 2014 TechEd in Barcelona marked the last event using that name. Microsoft altered its conference schedule and introduced the Microsoft Ignite name from 2015 on.

The conference normally lasts between three and five days, and consists of presentation and whiteboard sessions and hands-on labs. It offers opportunities to meet Microsoft experts, MVPs and community members. Networking is enhanced through parties, community areas and "Ask the Expert" sessions. The event also includes an exhibition area where vendors can show off technologies and sell products. There is a vast content catalog from which attendees can select sessions that will be most beneficial. An agenda is published online before the conference begins.

Africa
Was previously known as TechEd South Africa until 2007, where it changed to TechEd Africa. 2007 was also the last year the event was hosted at Sun City, after which it was moved to the Durban International Conference Centre (ICC) due to the growing size of the audience, which was no longer able to be accommodated at Sun City.

Australia
TechEd Australia is the largest TechEd in the Asia-Pacific region.

Europe
Microsoft Ignite is an annual event in cities like Amsterdam.

India
Microsoft TechEd India has been an annual fixture since 2003 except for 2008 which was the only year when Microsoft TechEd India event was not organized.

In 2006, TechEd was held in New Delhi, Pune, Mumbai, Chennai, Hyderabad and Bangalore during the month of June. There were two TechEd events held in each city, the first one delved into architectural aspects of technology and laid emphasis on the needs of the Architect audience alongside four tracks focused on Platform and Tools for Developers. The second event was geared towards technology professionals working on IT infrastructure.

In 2007, TechEd was held in Bangalore.	

In 2009, TechEd was held in Hyderabad in the month of May. Rechristened Microsoft TechMela, the name change was necessitated by an urge to Indianize the event and its content so that it aligned with the ethos of every Indian. It was attended by over 2,500 CXOs, TDMs, BDMs, Developers, IT Professionals, Architects, Designers, faculty Members and Technology Students.

TechEd-India 2009 was keynoted by Steve Ballmer, the only TechEd event worldwide where Steve Ballmer was to speak. There were 28 Technical Tracks that spanned more than 112 breakout sessions, 24 instructor-led Labs, more than 20 Chalk-Talk sessions. The tracks were designed as a navigational tool which assisted in finding the sessions and labs best suited for individual needs.

In 2011, TechEd India was held in Bangalore from March 23–25 at Hotel Lalit Ashok. The event included keynotes by Senior Microsoft Executives, breakout sessions, hands-on-labs, instructor-led labs, product team tents, free Microsoft certification, community programs and solution expo. The event was keynoted by Qi Lu.

In 2012, 2013, and 2014, Tech Ed India was held in Bangalore at The LaLiT Hotels, Palaces and Resorts.

Israel
TechEd conferences in Israel were held in Eilat. The first TechEd conference was held in 2001, with more than 1,000 participants. Six more conferences were held until 2010.

Latin America
The Latin American TechEd has always been held in São Paulo, Brazil. However, there was also an edition of it in Mexico in 2001.

Middle East
First started in 2010 and hosted in Dubai.

New Zealand
TechEd New Zealand is the largest IT Conference in New Zealand and is held annually in Auckland.

North America
Each year for the North American event changes to a new location.

TechEd Online
TechEd Online was an online supplement to the in-person events, which contained video interviews recorded at the event, videos of sessions and keynotes, blogs and speaker blog aggregation. Much of this content could first be found on Microsoft's Channel 9, but now is ordinarily available directly on the Ignite website itself.

For TechEd North America, video recordings, session slide decks, and supplemental content can be found on myTechEd.

myTechEd
Microsoft myTechEd is an online community and social networking tool where conference attendees can participate in technical discussions, access recordings of past year's sessions, and connect with speakers and other attendees through a directory. myTechEd is a free resource available for both in-person attendees and virtual attendees who are not able to make it to the annual conference.

Dates and Locations of TechEd Events

Dates and Locations of Ignite Events  
Gathered from event page and announcements from the event Twitter feed.

References

External links
 Microsoft Ignite Microsoft Ignite
 Microsoft TechEd North America Microsoft TechEd. Microsoft, 3 June 2010. Web. 3 June 2010.
 
 
 Microsoft Ignite Tel Aviv.

Microsoft conferences